(Sidney) Stewart Payne  was Anglican Archbishop of Newfoundland and Labrador and  Metropolitan of Canada in the late 20th century.
Born on 6 June 1932 and educated at the Memorial University of Newfoundland he was ordained in 1957. He served at Happy Valley, Bay Roberts and St. Anthony. He was elevated to the episcopate in 1978.

References

1932 births
Memorial University of Newfoundland alumni
Anglican bishops of Western Newfoundland
20th-century Anglican Church of Canada bishops
20th-century Anglican archbishops
Metropolitans of Canada
Living people